M. compactus  may refer to:
 Metridiochoerus compactus, an extinct pig species indigenous to the Pliocene and Pleistocene of Africa
 Molophilus compactus, a crane fly species in the genus Molophilus

See also
 Compactus